Class E 499.1 electric locomotives were constructed and built by Škoda Works in Plzeň for use in Czechoslovakia by the ČSD. They were also used outside Czechoslovakia in Poland as class EP05 and in the Soviet Union as ЧС3 (ChS3). In North Korea, licence built copies were used (100 series), and the ubiquitous Red Flag 1-class locomotives were derived from this design.

After the fall of the iron curtain and consequent upheavals in railway operations they remain in use with a number of railways. Still in the 1980s ČSD locomotives were renumbered to the class 141. After dividing Czechoslovakia in 1993 all locos of this class have remained in Czech republic.

History
The locomotive was produced in the years 1957-1960 in three types. 20E1, the prototype, different from serial production, 30E1 and 30E2. 61 engines were built in those series.

The prototype (E499.101) came into service on February 29, 1959. Most of locomotives stationed in Prague, but some of them were sent to Ústí nad Labem and Česká Třebová. Currently the whole series is being systematically withdrawn with last units used in Prague, Olomouc and Ústí nad Labem.

Technical data
Class E499.1 electric locomotives are used to pull both passenger and freight trains. They have driving cabs on either end of the box. This engine was not suited for multiple steering and shunting purposes. On a straight, horizontal track it could pull 600 t. passenger trains with the speed of up to 120 km/h and 1000 t. freight trains with the speed of 80 km/h.

Service in other countries

Poland

EU05
In need of modern electric locomotives for passenger trains, and unable to get timely delivery of EU06 locomotives from England, Poland bought 30 locomotives Type 44E from its southern neighbours. In 1961 it was the most modern locomotive running on Polish rail tracks. EU05 locomotives pulled fast passenger trains and were based in Warszawa Odolany and later in Warszawa Olszynka Grochowska depots. Those locomotives serviced chiefly connections from Warsaw to Poznań and Katowice.

EP05

In 1969 PKP started testing several changes to enable EU05 locomotives to achieve speeds up to 160 km/h. It appeared to be possible thanks to changing the transmission and as a result by 1977 almost all locomotives had been rebuilt to EP05 class, except for locomotives 09, 12 and 19 which had been scrapped earlier. To distinguish the new series from its predecessor, the color scheme was changed from two-tone green to orange.

Present day
There are two units of EU05/EP05 left in service, which are in fact EP05-22 engine repainted in 2003. It serves as an exhibit in Kraków. And EP05-23 which was obtained by PKP Intercity  and repainted into orange livery in 2017. EP05-23 is in planned service as an active exhibit

Soviet Union and Russia

ЧС3 (ChS3)

In 1960 and 1961 87 units of similar type 29E were built for the Soviet Union railways. They were suited to run on the broad gauge rails and received ЧС3 (ChS3) designation. Several units of this locomotive are still in use within Russian Railways pulling mostly passenger trains. In Russia ЧС3 are very often used in pairs.

North Korea
After buying a number of Czechoslovak-built Škoda Type 22E2 type locomotives to expand its electric locomotive fleet, the Korean State Railway of North Korea obtained a licence, including technology transfer, to produce the Type 30E2. Several of Type 30E2 were built by the Kim Chong-t'ae Electric Locomotive Works to gain experience with the design in preparation for the production of the Red Flag 1 class, whose design was based on that of the Type 30E2.

Although the total number of  North Korean-built Type 30E2, which were numbered in the 100 series, is unknown, at least one (number 114) is still operational.

Nicknames
 Czech in Polish - from nation of origin
 Piątka (Eng. The Five) in Poland - from locos number
 Bobina in the Czech Republic - from wheel arrangement Bo'Bo'

See also
 List of České dráhy locomotive classes

References

 Technical data and history of EU05 locomotives , URL accessed on June 7, 2007.
 History of EU05 and EP05 series , URL accessed on June 7, 2007.

3000 V DC locomotives
Škoda locomotives
Bo′Bo′ locomotives
Electric locomotives of Czechoslovakia
Electric locomotives of the Czech Republic
Railway locomotives introduced in 1957
Polish State Railways electric locomotives
Bo′Bo′ electric locomotives of Europe